Nonthaburi Football Club, is a Thai football club based in Nonthaburi Province. They play in Thai League 3 BKK-perimeter

Timeline
History of events of Nonthaburi Football Club

Stadium and locations

Season by season record

External links
 Official Website

Association football clubs established in 2010
Football clubs in Thailand
Sport in Nonthaburi province
2010 establishments in Thailand